The Xinsheng Road (also called 8th Avenue or Hsinsheng Road) is a major arterial in Taipei, Taiwan, connecting the Daan District in the south with the Zhongshan and the Shilin districts in the north. The roads were built along both sides of the Horikawa River in Japanese rule period, which was called Horikawa-dōri (Horikawa Avenue). Xinsheng Road is mainly a surface arterial, with the exception of the section between Zhongxiao Road and Zhongshan Road, where there is a four-lane expressway running above the surface arterial, which eventually carries the road over the Keelung River north of Minzu Road and onto Zhongshan Road on the other side.  Xinsheng literally means "New Life" and the road is named after the New Life Movement which was established by Chiang Kai-shek and Soong Mei-ling.

Landmarks
Notable landmarks along Xinsheng Road include:
 Xinsheng Park
 Xingtian Temple
 Daan Forest Park
 Wistaria Tea House

Sections

Xinsheng North Road 
 Section 1 : Civic Boulevard – Nanjing Road
 Section 2 : Nanjing Road – Minquan Road
 Section 3 : Minquan Road – Zhongshan Road

Xinsheng South Road 
 Section 1 : Civic Boulevard – Xinyi Road
 Section 2 : Xinyi Road – Heping Road
 Section 3 : Heping Road – Roosevelt Road

Major intersections 
 Roosevelt Road
 Xinhai Road
 Heping Road
 Xinyi Road
 Renai Road
 Zhongxiao Road
 Bade Road
 Songjiang Road
 Nanjing Road
 Changchung Road
 Minsheng Road
 Minquan Road
 Minzu Road
 Zhongshan Road

Exit list (expressway)

See also
 List of roads in Taiwan

References 

Streets in Taipei
Viaducts in Taiwan